Alexander Ector Orr (1831–1914) was a prominent businessman in New York City and was influential in the building of the New York City Subway system.

Personal life

Orr was the first of his family (which was soon to be prominent) to immigrate to the United States. Orr married Juliet Dows, heiress to the fortune of a large grain dealer.

Once established, Orr invited his nephew, Charles A. Munn, Sr., to join him in the United States. He accepted, immigrating from Ireland. Once Munn arrived, they established Munn, Orr & Company, a business concern engaged in wholesale provisions and slaughterhouses.

Businessman

A prominent New York financier and merchant, who during the Gilded Age served on the boards of twenty-nine corporations, Orr headed the New York Produce Exchange (1887–1888) and was president of the New York Chamber of Commerce (1894). Orr's marriage to Juliet Dows, the daughter of the nation's largest grain dealer, greatly enhanced his power and prominence. After the infamous corruption scandal of 1905, he became president of the Equitable Insurance Company. Best known for arranging the financing and construction of New York's subway system, his estate was valued at more than $10 million in 1914.

References

American businesspeople in insurance
British emigrants to the United States
Businesspeople from New York City
Burials at Green-Wood Cemetery
1831 births
1914 deaths
19th-century American businesspeople